Gymnomeniidae is a family of molluscs belonging to the order Pholidoskepia.

Genera:
 Genitoconia Salvini-Plawen, 1967 
 Gymnomenia Odhner, 1920 
 Wirenia Odhner, 1920

References

Molluscs